Tortworth is a small village and civil parish, near Thornbury in Gloucestershire, England. It has a population of 147 as of 2011. It lies on the B4509 road, which crosses the M5 motorway to the west of Tortworth.

History
In the Domesday Book of 1086 the manor is recorded as held by Turstin FitzRolf. Tortworth is noted for its ancient chestnut tree in St. Leonard's churchyard, which became known as the "Great Chestnut of Tortworth" as early as 1150. This tree measured 51 feet in circumference at 6 feet from the ground in 1720. The tree is one of fifty Great British Trees, selected in 2002 by The Tree Council to commemorate the Queen's Golden Jubilee.

Geography
The Tortworth inlier is the most complete section of "Silurian" rocks in the Bristol and South Gloucestershire area. Old red sandstone is most dominant.

Notable landmarks

The civil parish contains Tortworth Court. It was formerly the home of the Earls of Ducie, but is now run as a hotel. Tortworth Rectory, was part of Oriel College. It was renowned for its library collection, which was eventually purchased by the Earls of Ducie.

There is a national prison nearby, HM Prison Leyhill, which was converted into a prison from an army hospital in the post-war period. In 1985 the prison won the Windlesham Trophy for the best-kept prison gardens.

References

External links
 Tortworth village website
 Tortworth, Andrew Plaster, Bristol & Avon Family History Society Journal, June 2007
 Tortworth Chestnut on Flickr
St. Leonard's Church, Tortworth; CRoFTT benefice

Villages in South Gloucestershire District
Civil parishes in Gloucestershire